The Portuguese local elections of 2001 took place on 16 December. The elections consisted of three separate elections in the 308 Portuguese municipalities, the election for the Municipal Chambers, whose winner is elected mayor, another election for the Municipal Assembly and a last one for the lower-level Parish Assembly, whose winner is elected parish president. This last was held separately in the more than 4,200 parishes around the country.

The Social Democratic Party (PSD) won the elections by a landslide, defying polls in many cities across the country in particular the three main cities, Lisbon, Porto and Sintra. The victory of the PSD in these local election was the first since 1985, the last time the PSD won more mayors than the Socialists, although in 1997, the PS and PSD basically tied in number of elected mayors. The PSD won 11 of the 20 district capitals mainly Lisbon, won by Pedro Santana Lopes, and Porto, won by Rui Rio, plus many suburban cities like Sintra, Cascais, Vila Nova de Famalicão and Penafiel swung also to the Social Democrats.

The Socialist Party (PS) was the biggest loser of these elections. After 6 years in power governing without an absolute majority and adding to this a bad economy, the PS hopes of maintaining the largest number of mayors were slashed. The defeat was worse than expected because of loses in the main cities of Lisbon and Porto, where polls showed the PS with a solid lead. Because of the bad results of the party and a prospect of political instability, Prime Minister António Guterres resigned on election night stating that the country should not fall in "a political swamp".

The election was also very bad for Democratic Unity Coalition (CDU) in which they achieved their worst result in local elections till that date. The Communist-Green alliance lost 13 mayoral races plus 37 councillors and lost big cities like Évora and Loures to the PS. The People's Party also had a poor showing losing 5 cities, although this time they celebrated more coalitions with the PSD. On the other hands, the election returns were quite good for other smaller parties: the Left Bloc (BE) won 1 city (Salvaterra de Magos) from CDU and the Earth Party won Celorico da Beira from the PS. Independent movements were also allowed to run in these elections for the first time and won 3 cities.

Turnout in these elections remained unchanged in comparison with the 1997 election, as 60.1% of the electorate cast a ballot.

After these elections, a snap general election was called for March 2002.

Parties 

The main political forces involved in the election were:

 Left Bloc (BE)
 People's Party (CDS–PP) (only in some municipalities)1, 2
 Democratic Unity Coalition (CDU)2
 Socialist Party (PS)2
 Social Democratic Party (PSD) (only in some municipalities)1

1 The PSD and the CDS–PP formed coalitions in several municipalities. In some municipalities the PSD or CDS–PP also formed coalitions with PPM.
2 The PS formed also some coalitions with the CDS–PP and a coalition with CDU in Lisbon.

Results

Municipal Councils

National summary of votes and seats

|-
! rowspan="2" colspan=2 style="background-color:#E9E9E9" align=left|Parties
! rowspan="2" style="background-color:#E9E9E9" align=right|Votes
! rowspan="2" style="background-color:#E9E9E9" align=right|%
! rowspan="2" style="background-color:#E9E9E9" align=right|±pp swing
! rowspan="2" style="background-color:#E9E9E9" align=right|Candidacies
! colspan="2" style="background-color:#E9E9E9" align="center"|Councillors
! colspan="2" style="background-color:#E9E9E9" align="center"|Mayors
|- style="background-color:#E9E9E9"
! style="background-color:#E9E9E9" align="center"|Total
! style="background-color:#E9E9E9" align="center"|±
! style="background-color:#E9E9E9" align="center"|Total
! style="background-color:#E9E9E9" align="center"|±
|-
| 
|1,792,690||34.12||4.0||295||829||40||113||14
|-
| 
|1,488,897||28.22||4.5||263||774||29||142||15
|-
| 
|557,481||10.61||1.4||300||199||37||28||13
|-
|style="width: 10px" bgcolor=#FF9900 align="center" | 
|align=left|Social Democratic / People's
|472,581||8.99||6.0||38||114||103||15||15
|-
| 
|195,198||3.72||1.9||195||39||44||3||5
|-
|style="width: 10px" bgcolor=#FF9900 align="center" | 
|align=left|Social Democratic / PPM
|131,135||2.50||—||1||8||—||1||—
|-
|style="width: 10px" bgcolor=#FF66FF align="center" | 
|align=left|Socialist / Democratic Unity Coalition
|130,279||2.48||0.6||1||8||2||0||1
|-
|style="width: 8px" bgcolor=gray align="center" |
|align=left|Independents
|84,010||1.60||—||22||31||—||3||—
|-
|style="width: 9px" bgcolor=#FF9900 align="center" | 
|align=left|PSD / CDS–PP / PPM
|67,094 ||1.28||—||2||10||—||1||—
|- 
| 
|61,789||1.18||—||70||6||—||1||—
|-
|style="width: 10px" bgcolor=#FF66FF align="center" | 
|align=left|Socialist / People's
|25,551||0.49||—||7||15||—||0||—
|-
| 
|17,541||0.33||0.0||22||0||0||0||0
|-
| 
|12,568||0.24||0.2||19||4||2||1||1
|-
|style="width: 8px" bgcolor=#0093DD align="center" |
|align=left|People's / Social Democratic
|7,880||0.15||—||3||6||—||0||—
|-
|style="width: 10px" bgcolor=#E2062C align="center" | 
|align=left|People's Democratic Union
|5,318||0.10||0.3||11||0||0||0||0
|-
|style="width: 8px" bgcolor=#0093DD align="center" |
|align=left|People's / People's Monarchist
|4,289||0.08||—||3||1||—||0||—
|-
| 
|3,019||0.06||—||7||0||—||0||—
|-
|style="width: 8px" bgcolor=#0093DD align="center" |
|align=left|People's / Socialist
|2,010||0.04||—||1||2||—||0||—
|-
| 
|877||0.02||—||2||0||—||0||—
|-
| 
|294||0.01||0.1||1||0||5||0||1
|-
|colspan=2 align=left style="background-color:#E9E9E9"|Total valid
|width="65" align="right" style="background-color:#E9E9E9"|5,061,297
|width="40" align="right" style="background-color:#E9E9E9"|96.33
|width="40" align="right" style="background-color:#E9E9E9"|0.2
|width="40" align="right" style="background-color:#E9E9E9"|—
|width="45" align="right" style="background-color:#E9E9E9"|2,044
|width="45" align="right" style="background-color:#E9E9E9"|21
|width="45" align="right" style="background-color:#E9E9E9"|308
|width="45" align="right" style="background-color:#E9E9E9"|3
|-
|colspan=2|Blank ballots
|114,834||2.19||0.0||colspan=6 rowspan=4|
|-
|colspan=2|Invalid ballots
|78,049||1.49||0.1
|-
|colspan=2 align=left style="background-color:#E9E9E9"|Total
|width="65" align="right" style="background-color:#E9E9E9"|5,254,180
|width="40" align="right" style="background-color:#E9E9E9"|100.00
|width="40" align="right" style="background-color:#E9E9E9"|
|-
|colspan=2|Registered voters/turnout
||8,738,906||60.12||0.0
|-
| colspan=11 align=left | Source: Comissão Nacional de Eleições
|}

Municipality map

City control
The following table lists party control in all district capitals, as well as in municipalities above 100,000 inhabitants. Population estimates from the 2001 Census.

Municipal Assemblies

National summary of votes and seats

|-
! rowspan="2" colspan=2 style="background-color:#E9E9E9" align=left|Parties
! rowspan="2" style="background-color:#E9E9E9" align=right|Votes
! rowspan="2" style="background-color:#E9E9E9" align=right|%
! rowspan="2" style="background-color:#E9E9E9" align=right|±pp swing
! rowspan="2" style="background-color:#E9E9E9" align=right|Candidacies
! colspan="2" style="background-color:#E9E9E9" align="center"|Mandates
|- style="background-color:#E9E9E9"
! style="background-color:#E9E9E9" align="center"|Total
! style="background-color:#E9E9E9" align="center"|±
|- 
| 
|align=right|1,788,089
|align=right|34.03
|align=right|3.8
|align=right|
|align=right|2,721
|align=right|166
|-
| 
|align=right|1,430,532 	
|align=right|27.23
|align=right|3.2
|align=right|
|align=right|2,468
|align=right|111
|-  
| 
|align=right|585,426 		
|align=right|11.14
|align=right|1.3
|align=right|
|align=right|709
|align=right|89
|-
|style="width: 10px" bgcolor=#FF9900 align="center" | 
|align=left|Social Democratic / People's
|align=right|486,936 	
|align=right|9.27
|align=right|6.2
|align=right|
|align=right|427
|align=right|392
|-
| 
|align=right|226,774 	
|align=right|4.32
|align=right|3.1
|align=right|
|align=right|253
|align=right|184
|-
|style="width: 10px" bgcolor=#FF66FF align="center" | 
|align=left|Socialist / Democratic Unity Coalition
|align=right|129,852
|align=right|2.47
|align=right|0.6
|align=right|
|align=right|24
|align=right|6
|-
|style="width: 10px" bgcolor=#FF9900 align="center" | 
|align=left|Social Democratic / PPM
|align=right|124,457 	
|align=right|2.37
|align=right|—
|align=right|
|align=right|23
|align=right|—
|-
| 
|align=right|80,520 	
|align=right|1.53
|align=right|—
|align=right|
|align=right|28
|align=right|—
|-
|style="width: 9px" bgcolor=#FF9900 align="center" | 
|align=left|PSD / CDS–PP / PPM
|align=right|64,430 	
|align=right|1.23
|align=right|—
|align=right|
|align=right|40
|align=right|—
|-
|style="width: 8px" bgcolor=gray align="center" |
|align=left|Independents
|align=right|60,919
|align=right|1.16
|align=right|—
|align=right|
|align=right|93
|align=right|—
|-
|style="width: 10px" bgcolor=#FF66FF align="center" | 
|align=left|Socialist / People's
|align=right|26,174
|align=right|0.50
|align=right|—
|align=right|
|align=right|40
|align=right|—
|-
| 
|align=right|12,694 	
|align=right|0.24
|align=right|0.1
|align=right|
|align=right|18 
|align=right|13
|-
| 
|align=right|7,863 	 	  	
|align=right|0.15
|align=right|0.1
|align=right|
|align=right|1
|align=right|0
|-
|style="width: 8px" bgcolor=#0093DD align="center" |
|align=left|People's / Social Democratic
|align=right| 6,943
|align=right| 0.13
|align=right|—
|align=right|
|align=right|19
|align=right|—
|-
|style="width: 10px" bgcolor=#E2062C align="center" | 
|align=left|People's Democratic Union
|align=right| 5,800
|align=right| 0.11
|align=right|0.4
|align=right|
|align=right|2
|align=right|0
|-
|style="width: 8px" bgcolor=#0093DD align="center" |
|align=left|People's / People's Monarchist
|align=right| 4,425
|align=right| 0.08
|align=right|—
|align=right|
|align=right|3
|align=right|—
|-
|style="width: 8px" bgcolor=#0093DD align="center" |
|align=left|People's / Socialist
|align=right| 2,302
|align=right| 0.04
|align=right|—
|align=right|
|align=right|7
|align=right|—
|-
| 
|align=right| 779
|align=right| 0.01
|align=right|—
|align=right|
|align=right|0
|align=right|—
|-
| 
|align=right| 436
|align=right| 0.01
|align=right| 0.1
|align=right| 
|align=right| 0
|align=right| 16
|-
| 
|align=right| 155
|align=right| 0.00
|align=right|—
|align=right|
|align=right|0
|align=right|—
|-
|colspan=2 align=left style="background-color:#E9E9E9"|Total valid
|width="65" align="right" style="background-color:#E9E9E9"|5,045,506
|width="40" align="right" style="background-color:#E9E9E9"|96.02
|width="40" align="right" style="background-color:#E9E9E9"|0.2
|width="40" align="right" style="background-color:#E9E9E9"|—
|width="45" align="right" style="background-color:#E9E9E9"|6,876
|width="45" align="right" style="background-color:#E9E9E9"|69
|-
|colspan=2|Blank ballots
|130,359||2.48||0.1||colspan=6 rowspan=4|
|-
|colspan=2|Invalid ballots
|78,578||1.50||0.1
|-
|colspan=2 align=left style="background-color:#E9E9E9"|Total
|width="65" align="right" style="background-color:#E9E9E9"|5,254,443
|width="40" align="right" style="background-color:#E9E9E9"|100.00
|width="40" align="right" style="background-color:#E9E9E9"|
|-
|colspan=2|Registered voters/turnout
||8,738,906||60.13||0.0
|-
| colspan=11 align=left | Source: Comissão Nacional de Eleições
|}

Parish Assemblies

National summary of votes and seats

|-
! rowspan="2" colspan=2 style="background-color:#E9E9E9" align=left|Parties
! rowspan="2" style="background-color:#E9E9E9" align=right|Votes
! rowspan="2" style="background-color:#E9E9E9" align=right|%
! rowspan="2" style="background-color:#E9E9E9" align=right|±pp swing
! rowspan="2" style="background-color:#E9E9E9" align=right|Candidacies
! colspan="2" style="background-color:#E9E9E9" align="center"|Mandates
! colspan="2" style="background-color:#E9E9E9" align="center"|Presidents
|- style="background-color:#E9E9E9"
! style="background-color:#E9E9E9" align="center"|Total
! style="background-color:#E9E9E9" align="center"|±
! style="background-color:#E9E9E9" align="center"|Total
! style="background-color:#E9E9E9" align="center"|±
|-
| 
|1,775,531||33.85||2.7||3,578||13,195||435||1,523||
|-
| 
|1,392,019||26.54||3.7||3,073 ||12,148||812||1,649||
|-
| 
|586,844||11.19||1.2||2,139 ||2,466||265||232||
|-
|style="width: 10px" bgcolor=#FF9900 align="center" | 
|align=left|Social Democratic / People's
|431,002||8.22||3.5||544||2,124||1,486||215||
|-
|style="width: 8px" bgcolor=gray align="center" |
|align=left|Independents
|232,861 ||4.44||1.6||696 ||2,407||813||311||
|-
| 
|189,838||3.62||1.8||1,090 ||970||870||79||
|-
|style="width: 10px" bgcolor=#FF66FF align="center" | 
|align=left|Socialist / Democratic Unity Coalition
|132,918||2.53||0.7||53||309||99||35||
|-
|style="width: 10px" bgcolor=#FF9900 align="center" | 
|align=left|Social Democratic / PPM
|121,259||2.31||—||53||265||—||18||—
|-
|style="width: 9px" bgcolor=#FF9900 align="center" | 
|align=left|PSD / CDS–PP / PPM
|60,295 ||1.15||—||82||302||—||32||—
|- 
| 
|57,361||1.09||—||286||46||—||6||—
|-
|style="width: 10px" bgcolor=#FF66FF align="center" | 
|align=left|Socialist / People's
|25,583 ||0.49||—||35||112||—||2||—
|-
| 
|8,626 ||0.16||0.1||56||120||81||18||
|-
|style="width: 8px" bgcolor=#0093DD align="center" |
|align=left|People's / Social Democratic
|6,966||0.13||—||18||67||—||8||—
|-
|style="width: 10px" bgcolor=#E2062C align="center" | 
|align=left|People's Democratic Union
|5,299||0.10||0.2||49||7||1||0||
|-
| 
|4,961||0.09||0.0||27||1||1||0||
|-
|style="width: 8px" bgcolor=#0093DD align="center" |
|align=left|People's / People's Monarchist
|4,714 ||0.09||—||36||4||—||0||—
|-
|style="width: 8px" bgcolor=#0093DD align="center" |
|align=left|People's / Socialist
|2,326 ||0.04||—||8||25||—||1||—
|-
| 
|220||0.00||—||2||0||—||0||—
|-
| 
|98||0.00||0.1||1||1||79||0||
|-
|colspan=2 align=left style="background-color:#E9E9E9"|Total valid
|width="65" align="right" style="background-color:#E9E9E9"|5,038,721
|width="40" align="right" style="background-color:#E9E9E9"|96.05
|width="40" align="right" style="background-color:#E9E9E9"|0.1
|width="40" align="right" style="background-color:#E9E9E9"|—
|width="45" align="right" style="background-color:#E9E9E9"|34,569
|width="45" align="right" style="background-color:#E9E9E9"|616
|width="45" align="right" style="background-color:#E9E9E9"|4,129
|width="45" align="right" style="background-color:#E9E9E9"|
|-
|colspan=2|Blank ballots
|120,665||2.30||0.1||colspan=6 rowspan=3|
|-
|colspan=2|Invalid ballots
|86,409||1.65||0.2
|-
|colspan=2 align=left style="background-color:#E9E9E9"|Total (turnout 60.03%)
|width="65" align="right" style="background-color:#E9E9E9"|5,245,795
|width="40" align="right" style="background-color:#E9E9E9"|100.00
|width="40" align="right" style="background-color:#E9E9E9"|0.2
|-
|colspan=2|Registered voters/turnout
||8,738,906||60.03||0.3
|-
| colspan=11 align=left | Source: Comissão Nacional de Eleições Autárquicas 2001
|}

See also
 Politics of Portugal
 List of political parties in Portugal
 Elections in Portugal

References

External links
 Official results site, Portuguese Justice Ministry
 Portuguese Electoral Commission

2001 elections in Portugal
2001
December 2001 events in Europe